Carrossel is a Brazilian children's telenovela created by Íris Abravanel and written by Abel Santa Cruz. The TV show originally aired on SBT from 21 May 2012 to 26 July 2013. It is a Brazilian remake of the Mexican telenovela Carrusel (which in turn had been inspired by the Argentinean telenovela Jacinta Pichimahuida, la Maestra que no se Olvida). The Telenovela was particularly successful with children and led to several spin-offs including a cartoon series and television sitcom.

Films based on the novela were released, on 23 July 2015, Carrossel: O Filme, and a sequel called Carrossel 2: O Sumiço de Maria Joaquina, on 7 July 2016.

Plot
Helena Fernandes is a young and beautiful teacher starting her career. Her first job is at the Escola Mundial, teaching the principles of life to a third-grade class. Her warm and kindly nature wins the love of her students, all of whom have different personalities. At school, Helena has the support of employees Graça and Firmino, who love the students. But she has to endure the rules and requirements of Olívia, the director of the institution, and the envy of Suzana, a teacher who comes in to replace her for a period.

Outside of school, the children form a club led by Daniel called "Patrulha Salvadora". They gather in an abandoned house and help children who are not enrolled at Escola Mundial. These include: Tom, a wheelchair-using boy who lives with his mother Glória, a teacher; Clementina, a girl who is trapped inside her own house; and Abelardo Cruz, a mischievous boy who lives with his grandfather, who is in turn fighting with his father.

The action takes place in Escola Mundial, which is coordinated and organized by severe Director Olívia. The Portuguese Firmino Gonçalves and flustered Graça are responsible for cleaning and guarding the school. Several students also have special circumstances: Mário Ayala is embittered by the death of his mother, his father's absence, and his rude stepmother; Cirilo suffers from the bias of Maria Joaquina; Jaime has low grades; Marcelina puts up with the antics of her brother Paulo; and Carmen fights with her parents.

Adriano lives with his mother and his imaginary friends, among them, the talking sock Chulé, Cirilo lives with his parents José and Paula Rivera, Carmen lives with her brother Eduardo and her parents Inês and Frederico Carrilho, Maria Joaquina lives with her maid-nanny Joana and her parents Clara and Miguel Medsen, Paulo and Marcelina live with their parents Lilian and Roberto Guerra, Valéria lives with her parents Rosa and Ricardo Ferreira, Davi lives with his grandmother Sara and his parents Rebeca and Isaac Rabinovich, Jaime lives with his brother Jonas and his parents Heloísa and Rafael Palillo and Jorge lives with his parents Rosana and Alberto Cavalieri.

Renê, an old school friend of Suzana, is hired to replace Escola Mundial music teacher, Matilde. Renê meets Helena at a party and they fall in love, but Suzana is also in love with him and tells several lies to Helena so that she will stay away from him.

The plot ends in a children's dream about the future: Daniel founds a help center for needy children under the name of "Patrulha Salvadora"; Kokimoto moves to Japan and becomes a samurai; Paulo is elected federal deputy; Marcelina works as her brother's personal advisor; Alícia takes up her pilot career; Bibi settles into an acting career; Jorge supervises the values ​​of the Stock Exchange; Carmem fulfills her desire to be a teacher; Jaime continues as a footballer; Mario becomes a veterinarian; Davi marries Valéria, who becomes a television presenter, and is the father of triplets; Laura joins as a writer; Adriano builds his lunar station; Margarida works as a model and Maria Joaquina is her stylist, now married to Cirilo, who is a neurosurgeon. When the narrator finishes reporting what was happening with each of the characters, the scene was interrupted by Adriano, pensive in his bed: "Will the future be like this?", he asks himself.

Characters

Teacher Helena Fernandes (Rosanne Mulholland): The protagonist of the telenovela. She is a 24-year-old teacher who teaches the third grade at the Escola Mundial. Beloved by all her students, Helena is kind and protective.
Cirilo Rivera (Jean Paulo Campos): Is a poor black boy. He is better known by the students for being gullible and is often fooled by Paulo, Mário, or Kokimoto. He has a crush on Maria Joaquina.
Maria Joaquina Medsen (Larissa Manoela): She is a rich, racist, and somewhat arrogant girl. Maria constantly brags about her father, a prominent yet humble doctor, and looks down on everyone of a lower social class, especially Cirilo, for being black. However, she helps her classmates sometimes and ends up becoming Cirilo's friend.
Valéria Ferreira (Maisa Silva): A smart, rowdy, and sometimes mistrustful girl and Davi's girlfriend. She is always making jokes about other students during class, causing everyone to laugh.
Jaime Palillo (Nicholas Torres): Jaime is a chubby boy who doesn't understand the lessons at school. Despite being a little slow in his studies, Jaime is very gentle and always ready to help others.
Carmen Carrilho (Stefany Vaz): She is the poorest student in Helena's class and suffers from her parents' divorce. When Carmen has appendicitis and is operated on by Maria Joaquina's father, her operation brings her parents together again.
Davi Rabinovich (Guilherme Seta): Valéria's Jewish boyfriend. He is called a coward by his classmates. Davi has a pet turtle named Relâmpago and once wished to make him into soup to cure Firmino, who was sick.
Laura Gianolli (Aysha Benelli): This chubby and gluttonous girl dotes on things being "romantic". Some students make fun of her weight.
Daniel Zapata (Thomaz Costa): The most intelligent and correct student in the class. He is good friends with Maria Joaquina and Margarida Garcia, and he is the president of the boys' club.
Paulo Guerra (Lucas Santos): Paulo is the most troublesome in the class, a bully who makes jokes about Cirilo and Laura and mistreats his little sister Marcelina.
Mário Ayala (Gustavo Daneluz): Mario lives with his father Germano Ayala, his stepsister, and his mean stepmother Natália Ayala. He studies at the Escola Mundial after being sent out of another school for misbehaving. On his first school day, Mario behaves so badly that Helena cries. In the course of time, his demeanor gets better and he becomes friends with everyone. He loves animals and once adopted a street dog and named it Rabito.
Marcelina Guerra (Ana Zimerman): The sister of Paulo Guerra. Her brother hates her, but she still loves him and says the bad things he does are not his fault. She is usually made fun of because she is the smallest in her class.
Adriano Ramos (Konstantino Atan): He has crazy dreams, which make him sleep during class time. In his room, he likes to talk to an old sock, named Chulé, and a chair named Senhor Cadeirudo.
Alícia Gusman (Fernanda Concon): The tomboy of the class, she wears mismatching clothes, enjoys radical sports and rides her skateboard to school.
Bibi Smith (Victória Diniz): She has an American accent because she lived in the US and mixes English words in with her Portuguese. She is the best friend of Maria Joaquina.
Jorge Cavalieri (Léo Belmonte): The richest boy in the class and Maria Joaquina's neighbour. Jorge is very proud and acts superior to his classmates, who don't like him but they still hang out with him.
Kokimoto Mishima (Matheus Ueta): He is very small but smart. He wears a Japanese band on his head (a hachimaki) to say that he is Japanese. He is friends with Paulo Guerra and helps him with almost all his plans, but he never gets in trouble for doing them.
Tom (João Lucas Takaki): He is in a wheelchair from a car crash which killed his father. He lives with Ms. Glória, his mother. Tom was scared to go to school because he thought the students would make fun of him, but the students of the third grade showed this wasn't the case.
Teacher Suzana Bustamante (Lívia Andrade): A fourth-grade teacher who substitutes for the class when Helena has a car accident. She is in love with Renê, the music teacher, and tries to sabotage his relationship with Helena. She is also friends with Principal Olivia and gossips about Helena.
Teacher Renê Magalhães (Gustavo Wabner): The Escola Mundial music teacher. He has been friends with Suzana since college and has a crush on Helena. The students of the third grade love him, so they always behave during his class.
Firmino Gonçalves (Fernando Benini): He was born in Portugal and came to Brazil when he was older. He is a widower and the Escola Mundial groundskeeper, where the students are like the children he never had.
Graça (Márcia de Oliveira): The maid at Escola Mundial. She loves to hear everything everyone says and voluntarily passes on information to Helena. She complains her job is not good. She hates Suzana and says she is a snake. She is a great friend of Firmino.
Principal Olívia Veider (Noemi Gerbelli): She thinks everything can be solved with discipline. She hates Helena and believes Suzana's gossip about her.

Cast

Special participations

International broadcast
 In 2014 an English version of Carrossel was broadcast on the Jamaican television channel TVJ (Television Jamaica)

Spin-off series
On 22 February 2013 SBT and Super Toons confirmed they would launch in the second half of the 2013 animated spin-off of the telenovela. Production began with nine episodes of 26 minutes, which was intended to be shown across Latin America.

Also a few chapters before the premiere of the telenovela Chiquititas, which replaced Carrossel in the schedule, a mini-journal called "Carrossel TV" was aired with the characters of Carrossel presenting. The skit was performed with Valéria, Maria Joaquina, Cirilo, Jaime and Kokimoto doing interviews with the characters of Chiquititas. In the break between series SBT created a children's afternoon program called Clube do Carrossel with the same structure of other children's programs on the channel, like Bom Dia & Companhia, featuring cartoons and segments with viewers.

In 2014 Patrulha Salvadora was released which was supposed to be a continuation of the telenovela focused on action and suspense, with characters that were superheroes.

References

External links
 Official website 

2012 telenovelas
2012 Brazilian television series debuts
2013 Brazilian television series endings
Brazilian fantasy television series
Brazilian telenovelas
Brazilian television series based on Argentine television series
Brazilian television series based on Mexican television series
Children's telenovelas
Comedy telenovelas
Fictional schools
Japanese-Brazilian culture
Musical telenovelas
Portuguese-language telenovelas
Sentient toys in fiction
Sistema Brasileiro de Televisão telenovelas
Television shows set in São Paulo
Television series about bullying
Television series about educators